Rustam Valiullin (born in Ulianovsk on ) is a retired Belarusian biathlete.

He competed in the 2002, 2006 and 2010 Winter Olympics for Belarus. His best finish is 11th, as a member of the Belarusian relay team in 2006 and 2010. His best individual performance is 24th, in the 2006 sprint.

As of March 2013, he has won two medals at the Biathlon World Championships, both in relays; bronze in the men's in 2003 and silver in the mixed in 2008. His best individual performance in a World Championships is 7th, in the 2004 individual.

As of March 2013, he has earned four Biathlon World Cup victories, all in the men's relay. His best individual finish is from 2006/07, 5th in the individual event at Lahti in 2004/05. His best overall finish in the Biathlon World Cup is 32nd, in 2005/06 .

World Cup Podiums

References 

1976 births
Biathletes at the 2002 Winter Olympics
Biathletes at the 2006 Winter Olympics
Biathletes at the 2010 Winter Olympics
Belarusian male biathletes
Living people
Olympic biathletes of Belarus
Sportspeople from Ulyanovsk
Tatar sportspeople
Biathlon World Championships medalists